Lady Macbeth of Mtsensk, Op. 29 is an opera in four acts and nine scenes by Dmitri Shostakovich. The libretto, jointly written by Alexander Preys and the composer, is based on the novella Lady Macbeth of the Mtsensk District by Nikolai Leskov.

Dedicated by Shostakovich to his first wife, physicist Nina Varzar, the roughly 160-minute opera was first performed on 22 January 1934 at the Leningrad Maly Operny, and two days later in Moscow. It incorporates elements of expressionism and verismo, telling the story of a lonely woman in 19th-century Russia who falls in love with one of her husband's workers and is driven to murder.

Performance history

Despite early success on popular and official levels, Lady Macbeth became the vehicle for a general denunciation of Shostakovich's music by the Communist Party in early 1936: after being condemned in an anonymous article (sometimes attributed to Joseph Stalin but actually authored by David Zaslavsky) in Pravda, titled "Muddle Instead of Music", it was banned in the Soviet Union for almost thirty years, until 1961.

The composer in 1962 revised Lady Macbeth, renaming it Katerina Izmailova and assigning his Opus 114. He replaced two of its intermezzos, adjusted act 1, scene 3, and made smaller changes elsewhere. Katerina Izmailova was first performed on 26 December 1962 in Moscow at the Stanislavski-Nemirovich-Danchenko Musical Theatre, and first given a studio recording in 1964. But since Shostakovich's death the original version has been more often performed. The original uncensored version was not performed again in Russia until 2000. Despite the opera's difficult history of censorship, the work has entered the standard repertory, in 2017–18 being the fourth most-produced Russian opera, and 54th most produced opera overall worldwide.

Roles

Synopsis
Although the opera shares the basic characters and outline of the play, it has a number of differences from the original story in terms of plot and emphasis. One example is in the convoy after Katerina gives Sergei her stockings: in the opera, all the women mock Katerina, whereas in the story, Sergei and Sonya mock her while Fiona and Gordyushka shame them in response to their cruelty toward her.

Act 1

Scene 1: Katerina's room

Katerina is unhappily married to Zinovy, a provincial flour-merchant. She complains to herself of her loneliness. Her father-in-law, Boris, angered at her response to his saying that mushrooms are his favourite dish, says that her loneliness is her fault due to her not producing an heir. She replies that Zinovy cannot give her a child – which Boris disdains; he then threatens her if she decides to accept some youthful lover. Zinovy is called away on business, and Boris – against his son's inclinations – makes Katerina swear before an icon to be faithful. A servant, Aksinya, tells Katerina about the womanising new clerk, Sergei.

Scene 2: The Izmailovs' yard

Sergei and his comrades are sexually harassing Aksinya. Katerina intervenes. She berates him for his machismo and asserts that women are as brave and capable as men. Sergei is willing to prove her wrong and they wrestle; she is thrown down and Sergei falls on top of her. Boris appears. She says that she tripped and Sergei, in trying to help her, fell down also. The other peasants back her up. Boris however is suspicious and roars at the peasants, telling them to get back to work, before ordering Katerina to fry some mushrooms for him and threatening to tell Zinovy about her behaviour.

Scene 3: Katerina's room

Katerina prepares to go to bed. Sergei knocks on her door with the excuse that he wants to borrow a book because he cannot sleep, but Katerina has none; she cannot read. As she is about to close the door, he attempts to seduce her by remembering their wrestling match earlier that day. He gets into the room and forces himself on her. Afterwards, she tells him to leave, but he refuses and she agrees to embark on an affair with him. Boris knocks on the door and confirms that Katerina is in bed and locks her in. Sergei is trapped in the room, and the two make love again.

Act 2
Scene 4: The yard

One night a week later.
Boris, unable to sleep due to unease about thieves, is walking in the courtyard in the pre-dawn darkness. He, remembering his days as a young rake and knowing Zinovy's low libido, is considering seducing Katerina himself to fulfill his son's marital duties. He spots Sergei climbing out of Katerina's window. He catches him and publicly whips him as a burglar, then has him locked up. Katerina witnesses this but cannot stop this because she remains locked in her room. When she eventually manages to climb down the eavestrough-drainpipe, the other servants restrain her on Boris' order. After being exhausted by beating Sergei, Boris demands a meal, saying that he will whip Sergei again the next day and dispatches a servant to recall Zinovy, saying that Zinovy is to be told that there's trouble at home. Katerina adds rat-poison to some mushrooms and gives them to him. As he is dying, calling for a priest, she retrieves the keys to free Sergei. The priest, called by the arriving morning shift of workers who find Boris in agony, arrives: Boris vainly tries to tell him that he was poisoned and falls back dead pointing at Katerina. Katerina, weeping crocodile tears, convinces the priest that Boris has accidentally eaten poisonous mushrooms and he says a prayer over Boris' body.

Scene 5: Katerina's room

Katerina and Sergei are together. Sergei querulously says that their affair will have to end due to Zinovy's impending return and that he wishes that he and Katerina could marry – Katerina assures him that they'll marry but refuses to tell him how she'll arrange it. Sergei then falls asleep; Katerina is then tormented by Boris' ghost and cannot sleep. Later, she hears Zinovy returning. He has been called back by one of the servants with the news of his father's death. Although Sergei hides, Zinovy sees his trousers and belt and guesses the truth. As he and Katerina quarrel, he whips her with the belt. Hearing Katerina's cries, Sergei emerges and confronts Zinovy, who then tries to escape to call the servants. Katerina stops Zinovy: she and Sergei then proceed to strangle him; he is finally finished off by Sergei with a blow on the head with a heavy candlestick. The lovers hide the corpse in the wine-cellar.

Act 3
Scene 6: Near the cellar

Following Zinovy's disappearance, he has been presumed dead. Katerina and Sergei prepare to get married, but she is tormented by the fact that Zinovy's corpse is hidden in the wine cellar. Sergei reassures her and they leave for the wedding ceremony. A drunken peasant breaks into the cellar, finds Zinovy's body and goes to fetch the police.

Scene 7: The police station

The police are complaining about not being invited to the wedding and vainly try to distract themselves by tormenting a socialist schoolteacher because of his alleged atheism when the peasant arrives and gives them the opportunity for revenge.

Scene 8: The Izmailov garden

Everyone is drunk at the wedding. Katerina sees that the cellar door is open, but the police arrive as she and Sergei are trying to escape.

Act 4
Scene 9. A temporary convict camp near a bridge

On the way to penal labour to Siberia, Katerina bribes a guard to allow her to meet Sergei. He blames her for everything. After she leaves, Sergei tries to seduce another convict, Sonyetka. She demands a pair of stockings as her price. Sergei tricks Katerina into giving him hers, whereupon he gives them to Sonyetka. Sonyetka and the other convicts taunt Katerina, who pushes Sonyetka into an icy river – also, herself, falling in. They are swept away and the convict train moves on.

Critical reactions
One criticism of the work focused on its sexual content, particularly the way in which the action is depicted in the music. A 1935 review in the New York Sun called it "pornophony", referring to the lurid descriptive music in the sex scenes. Stravinsky described the opera as "lamentably provincial", considering the musical portrayal primitively realistic.

The thrust of the Pravda criticism was in terms of morality; it condemned the opera's sympathetic portrayal of the eponymous character, an adulteress and murderess. At the time, the composer justified the sympathetic portrayal of Katerina in Soviet terms, saying she was a victim of the circumstances of oppressive, pre-revolutionary Russia.

This criticism was revived in a different way by Richard Taruskin in a 1989 article, where he interprets the work in the context of Stalin's campaign against the kulaks in 1930, considering its portrayal of the killings of Katerina's kulak in-laws as "a justification of genocide". Daniil Zhitomirsky accuses the work of "primitive satire" in its treatment of the priest and police, but acknowledges the "incredible force" of the last scene.

Adaptations
 1966 Katerina Izmailova – the opera was adapted into a film directed by Mikhail Shapiro, starring Galina Vishnevskaya as Katerina, produced by Lenfilm and filmed in the Sovscope 70mm film process.
 1992 Lady Macbeth von Mzensk – by Czech director Petr Weigl, starring  as Katerina, the film used the 1979 Mstislav Rostropovich recording with Galina Vishnevskaya dubbing over Hrubesová as Katerina.

Recordings
 1979 Mstislav Rostropovich (conductor), London Philharmonic Orchestra, Galina Vishnevskaya (Katerina Lvovna Izmailova); Nicolai Gedda (Sergey); Taru Valjakka (Aksinya); Dimiter Petkov (Boris Timofeyevich Izmailov); Birgit Finnilä (Sonyetka); Werner Krenn (Zinovy Borisovich Izmailov); (Label: EMI).
 1992 Myung-whun Chung (conductor); Opéra Bastille; Maria Ewing (Katerina); Philip Langridge (Zinovi) Aage Haugland (Boris); Sergej Larin (Sergey); Kristine Ciesinski (Aksinya); Elena Zaremba (Sonyetka); Kurt Moll (Old Convict); (Label: Deutsche Grammophon).
 2006 Mariss Jansons (conductor); Royal Concertgebouw Orchestra; Eva-Maria Westbroek (Katerina Lvovna Izmailova); Christopher Ventris (Sergey); Carole Wilson (Aksinya); Vladimir Vaneev (Boris Timofeyevich Izmailov); Lani Poulson (Sonyetka); Ludovít Ludha (Zinovy Borisovich Izmailov); Stage Director: Martin Kušej, Muziektheater (Label: Opus Arte).
 A 1964 recording exists of the Katerina Izmailova version with the following forces: Eleonora Andreyeva, Eduard Bulavin, V. Radziyevsky, Moscow Radio Symphony Orchestra and State Moscow Choir, Gennady Provatorov (conductor).

References
Notes

Cited sources
Wilson, Elizabeth (1994). Shostakovich: A Life Remembered. Princeton University Press.

Further reading
 
Taruskin, Richard (1989). "The Opera and the Dictator: the peculiar martyrdom of Dmitri Shostakovich." The New Republic, March 20, 1989, pp. 34–40.

External links

Operas by Dmitri Shostakovich
Russian-language operas
Operas
Operas set in Russia
1934 operas
1934 in the Soviet Union
Adultery in theatre
Operas based on novels
Operas set in the 19th century